Deicide is the debut album by American death metal band Deicide. It was released on June 25, 1990, by Roadrunner Records. The album contains all of their demo tracks, plus the songs "Deicide" and "Mephistopheles".

Background
While containing mostly Satanic or blasphemous lyrical themes, "Lunatic of God's Creation" and "Carnage in the Temple of the Damned" concern Charles Manson and Jim Jones respectively, and "Dead by Dawn" deals with the plot of the 1981 horror film, The Evil Dead.

"Dead by Dawn" was featured in the 2009 video game Grand Theft Auto IV: The Lost and Damned on the radio station Liberty City Hardcore.

Deicide is sometimes considered to be the bestselling death metal album of all time. Nielsen SoundScan lists it second after Morbid Angel's Covenant up until 2003; however, Deicide was released before SoundScan went into effect, so the SoundScan figure lacks pre-Soundscan sales.

Glen Benton has stated that no effects were used on his vocals while recording the album, though several songs do contain a pitch-shifted vocal effect.

The album was recorded at Morrisound Studios in Tampa, Florida, where Deicide would record most of their subsequent works.

Critical reception

Bradley Torreano from AllMusic said, "with a shockingly tight performance and a handful of evil anthems, Glen Benton and company managed to craft a death metal classic" and that "this album struck a chord that would, for good or bad, instantly inspire legions of like-minded groups. The riffs are actually memorable, with insane blastbeat drums and an uncanny sense of timing guiding the songs as they charge through one by one." He concluded the review saying that Deicide "managed to craft one truly great album in the death metal genre that will survive long after the gimmicks are gone."

Niall from The Metal Observer described the song "Dead by Dawn" as "simplistic yet so powerful in its delivery that you can't help but be taken aback by its ferocity."

Track listing
All songs written by Deicide (Glen Benton and Steve Asheim).

Personnel
Glen Benton – vocals, bass
Eric Hoffman – guitars
Brian Hoffman – guitars
Steve Asheim – drums
Deicide – production
Scott Burns – production

References 

1990 debut albums
Deicide (band) albums
Roadrunner Records albums
Albums produced by Scott Burns (record producer)
Albums recorded at Morrisound Recording